Brendan Courtney (born 24 June 1971 in Dublin) is an Irish TV presenter and fashion designer. He was the first openly gay presenter in Ireland. He has hosted Wanderlust on RTÉ Two, The Brendan Courtney Show on TV3.

Career
Courtney began his career on RTÉ Two's Wanderlust and ITV1's Love Match UK. He was the main developer of the idea of Wanderlust. He previously hosted The Brendan Courtney Show, a prime time talk show on Ireland's TV3 television channel. He also presented the RTÉ reality show Treasure Island.

In October 2006, he became the presenter on ITV2's late night dating show Playdate. From 2006 to 2008 he hosted and produced The Clothes Show with Caryn Franklyn and Louise Redknapp, As of Autumn 2008, he was co-hosting RTÉ One's Off the Rails. He also frequently hosted at the Clothes Show Live in Birmingham. He was on the panel of judges on Ladies' Day at the 138th RDS Horse Show on 4 August 2011. He has also judged Alternative Miss Ireland in The George, Dublin.  He is one half of design duo Lennon Courtney along with Sonya Lennon.

Since 2020 he was hosted Keys To My Life on RTE1.

Personal life
In August 2009, Courtney spoke at a rally in Dublin requesting full marriage equality. He was attacked in hate crime by a stranger while walking home down South Great George's Street in Dublin in 2011, a man punched him in the face and shouted "queer" before running away. Courtney said it was "disgraceful" that such an incident could occur in Dublin. He told Liveline that more than 50 other gay people had told him of their own experiences of being assaulted or verbally abused in towns nationwide.

See also
 Significant acts of violence against LGBT people
 Violence against LGBT people

References

External links
 

1972 births
Gay entertainers
Irish LGBT broadcasters
Irish LGBT entertainers
Living people
People from Tallaght
RTÉ television presenters
Television presenters from the Republic of Ireland
Virgin Media Television (Ireland) presenters
Victims of anti-LGBT hate crimes
You're a Star contestants
21st-century Irish LGBT people